Zia Shahzad (born 18 June 1996) is a Pakistani cricketer. He made his List A debut for Lahore Blues in the 2018–19 Quaid-e-Azam One Day Cup on 22 September 2018. He made his first-class debut for Lahore Blues in the 2018–19 Quaid-e-Azam Trophy on 13 November 2018.

References

External links
 

1996 births
Living people
Pakistani cricketers
Lahore Blues cricketers
Place of birth missing (living people)